Mohammed Ahmed Sadek (14 October 1917 – 25 March 1991) was an Egyptian colonel general who served as defense minister under the rule of President Anwar Sadat.

Education
Sadek graduated from the Egypt's military academy in 1938 and from M. V. Frunze Military Academy in the Soviet Union.

Career
Sadek joined the army and took part in the Palestine war in 1948 and the Suez Campaign in 1956 (during which he served with the 2nd Infantry Division). From 1962 to 1964 he was military attaché at the Egypt's embassy in Bonn. Then he was made the curricula director of the military academy in 1965 where he served until 1967. He was the head of military intelligence from June 1967 to 1969. In September 1969, he briefly acted as the general secretary of the Pan Arab Organization, being in charge of military affairs. He was also named as the Chief of the General Staff by President Gamal Abdel Nasser in September 1969. In 1970, Sadek was promoted to the rank of lieutenant general.

Sadek was appointed defense minister by Anwar Sadat in May 1971 when Mohammed Fawzi resigned from office. Upon his appointment, he was promoted to full general. When Sadek was in office, he also held the job of armed forces commander in chief. In October 1972, Sadek was dismissed from office, and was put under house arrest. Sadek's anti-Soviet approach was cited as the reason for his dismissal. Another reason given for Sadek's dismissal was his criticisms over Anwar Sadat's approach concerning the war with Israel. Sadek was replaced by Ahmed Ismail Ali as defense minister in October 1972.

References

External links

20th-century Egyptian politicians
1917 births
1991 deaths
Chiefs of the General Staff (Egypt)
Defence Ministers of Egypt
Directors of the Military Intelligence and Reconnaissance (Egypt)
Egyptian generals
Egyptian Military Academy alumni
Frunze Military Academy alumni
Military personnel from Cairo